Ash Town railway station  was a railway station on the East Kent Light Railway. The station served the village of Ash.

History
Opened by the East Kent Light Railway on 16 October 1916, it attracted fleeting interest from the Southern Railway. However this faded and the railway stayed independent until being absorbed into the Southern Region of British Railways on nationalisation in 1948. It closed to passenger traffic after the last train on 30 October that year. The track was removed in May 1954. Today there is no trace of the station or the railway as the site is now landscaped into a field.

References

Sources

External links
 East Kent light railway page at the Colonel Stephens Railway Museum website
Sub Brit Page

Disused railway stations in Kent
Former East Kent Light Railway stations
Railway stations in Great Britain opened in 1916
Railway stations in Great Britain closed in 1948
1916 establishments in England
1948 disestablishments in England